Laurie Williams may refer to:

Laurie Williams (cricketer) (1968–2002), West Indian male cricketer
Laurie Williams (footballer) (born 1948), Scottish footballer
Laurie Williams (software engineer)
Laurie Williams (wheelchair basketball) (born 1992), British female wheelchair basketball player